Jonathan James Caldwell (born 10 June 1984) is a professional golfer from Clandeboye, Northern Ireland.

Amateur career
Caldwell attended the University of South Alabama from 2004 to 2008. He competed in the 2007 Walker Cup.

Professional career
Caldwell played on the 2009 European Tour, but did not perform well enough to retain his card. He played a number of events on the Challenge Tour in 2009, 2010 and 2011. From 2012 to 2017 he played mostly on the PGA EuroPro Tour, winning tournaments in 2016 and 2017. He finished fifth in the 2017 Order of Merit to earn a place on the Challenge Tour for 2018.

In June 2021, Caldwell claimed his breakthrough win at the Scandinavian Mixed, an event co-sanctioned by the Ladies European Tour. Caldwell had not previously finished better than 5th on the European Tour.

Professional wins (3)

European Tour wins (1)

1Mixed event with the Ladies European Tour

PGA EuroPro Tour wins (2)

Team appearances
Amateur
European Boys' Team Championship (representing Ireland): 2002
European Amateur Team Championship (representing Ireland): 2007 (winners), 2008
Walker Cup (representing Great Britain & Ireland): 2007
Palmer Cup (representing Europe): 2008 (winners)
St Andrews Trophy (representing Great Britain & Ireland): 2008 (winners)
Eisenhower Trophy (representing Ireland): 2008

See also
2008 European Tour Qualifying School graduates
2019 European Tour Qualifying School graduates

References

External links

Male golfers from Northern Ireland
European Tour golfers
South Alabama Jaguars men's golfers
People from Bangor, County Down
1984 births
Living people